Yumie (written: 弓枝 or 弓絵) is a feminine Japanese given name. Notable people with the name include:

, Japanese curler
, Japanese writer
, Japanese screenwriter
, Japanese luger

Japanese feminine given names